Gulbarga Vidhan Sabha seat was one of the seats in Karnataka state assembly in India until 2008 when it was made defunct. It was part of Gulbarga Lok Sabha seat.

Members of Assembly

Gulbarga (Hyderabad State)
 1951: Mohamed Ali Mehtab Ali, Indian National Congress

Gulbarga (Mysore State)
 1957: Mohamed Ali Mehtab Ali, Indian National Congress
 1962: Gangadhar Namoshi, Communist Party of India
 1967: Mohamed Ali Mehtab Ali, Indian National Congress
 1972: Mohamed Ali Mehtab Ali, Indian National Congress

Gulbarga (Karnataka State)
 1978: Qamarul Islam, Independent
 1983: S. K. Kanta, Janata Party
 1985: S. K. Kanta, Janata Party
 1989: Qamarul Islam, Muslim League
 1994: Qamarul Islam, Indian National League
 1996 (By-Poll): Kaiser Mahmood Maniyar, Janata Dal
 1999: Qamarul Islam, Indian National Congress
 2004: Chandrashekar Patil Revoor, Bharatiya Janata Party
 2008 onwards : Seat does not exist

Election results

1967 Assembly Election
 M. A. M. Ali (INC) : 17,694 votes    
 G. Namoshi (CPM) : 13,075

2004 Assembly Election
 Chandrashekar D Patil Revoor (BJP) : 78,845 votes  
 Qamarul Islam (INC) : 74645

See also 
 List of constituencies of Karnataka Legislative Assembly

References 

Former assembly constituencies of Karnataka
Kalaburagi